Tiszaújváros is an industrial town in Borsod-Abaúj-Zemplén county, Northern Hungary,  south-east of Miskolc, near the river Tisza.

History
Tiszaújváros as a town owes its existence to the industrialization wave that took over the then-socialist Hungary after World War II. The government wanted to speed up industrial development and to create new job opportunities in the north-eastern part of the country. 
The town was built up in the outskirts of the old village Tiszaszederkény. In legal terms the old village and the new town are the same: the village became a town in 1966 and was renamed twice, in 1970 and in 1991.

The construction of the town began on 9 September 1955; among the first buildings was a thermal power station and some blocks of flats around it. In the next stage of construction the Tiszai Vegyi Kombinát (TVK, "Chemical Factory") was built. It is one of the major chemical complexes in Hungary and, according to their website, represents more than 20% of petrochemical capacities in Central Europe. The first production unit, the paint factory started operating in 1961. Newer production units produce chemical fertilizers, polyethylene, and carbon black. An oil refinery was built too.

The factories needed workers, so living quarters were needed in the town. By 1962 several houses were built, mainly using prisoner labor force, and shops and restaurants were opened as well. On 1 June 1961 the council of Tiszaszederkény moved to the new town. The first stage of construction was over. During the second stage (1962–1965) more houses and shops were built. By 1966 there were 1,464 flats for the workers, and on 1 April 1966 the town was officially granted town status. Between 1966 and 1970 – in the 3rd stage of town construction – two primary schools, a secondary school and a community centre were built. The town was now inhabited by 10,000 people.

On 22 April 1970 – the 100th anniversary of Lenin's birth – the town's name was changed to Leninváros (Lenin Town).

In the 1980s the town developed slower, but steadily. In 1989 the socialist regime ended in Hungary, and in 1991 the town's name was changed to Tiszaújváros (literally: "Tisza New Town", i.e., 'New Town on the Tisza River'; another Hungarian industrial town, Sztálinváros – Stalin Town – similarly changed its name to Dunaújváros – "New Town on the Danube" – three decades earlier). During the 1990s the town developed fast, three churches and several new houses were built.

Sights
One of the most popular tourist attractions is a thermal bath and water park with chutes.

Twin towns – sister cities

Tiszaújváros is twinned with:

 Berehove, Ukraine
 Dexing, China
 Friesenheim (Ludwigshafen), Germany
 Miercurea Ciuc, Romania
 Neuhofen an der Krems, Austria
 Rimavská Sobota, Slovakia
 Świętochłowice, Poland
 Zawiercie County, Poland

Gallery

References

External links

 in Hungarian

Populated places established in 1955
Populated places in Borsod-Abaúj-Zemplén County
Socialist planned cities
Planned cities in Hungary
1955 establishments in Hungary